The Coaches vs. Cancer Classic was an annual college basketball tournament event benefiting cancer research held from 2012 to 2014. The event was held at the Barclays Center in Brooklyn, New York, and televised by truTV. The tournament replaced the previous Coaches vs. Cancer Classic tournament of 1995-2011, which was renamed the 2K Sports Classic in 2012 when it became a charitable event for the Wounded Warrior Project.

The tournament featured 12 schools, with four host schools playing two games on campus and advancing to the Championship Rounds held at the Barclays Center.  The remainder of the field participated in a round-robin series at one of the two sub-host sites.

The Florida State Seminoles won the inaugural Coaches vs. Cancer Classic in 2012 by defeating the St. Joseph's Hawks 73–66. The tournament was held again in 2013 and 2014, but then was quietly discontinued.

Most appearances

All-time Championship games

2012 - Florida State 73, St. Joseph's 66
2013 - Michigan State 87, Oklahoma 76
2014 - Duke 70, Stanford 59

2012 participants and bracket

BYU
Florida State (champions) 
Notre Dame
Saint Joseph's
Tennessee State
Georgia State (sub-host site)
South Alabama
Evansville (sub-host site)
Yale
Buffalo
Western Illinois
Monmouth

Championship Bracket

2013 participants and bracket

Columbia
Idaho 
Kent State (sub-host site)
Michigan State
Niagara
North Texas 
Oklahoma
Portland (sub-host site) 
Seton Hall
USC Upstate
Virginia Tech
Western Carolina

Championship Bracket

2014 participants and bracket
American
Duke
Fairfield (sub-host site)
Louisiana Tech (sub-host site)
Morehead State
Presbyterian
Sam Houston State
South Dakota
Temple
UNLV
Wofford

Championship Bracket

References

External links
 Official website

2012 establishments in New York City
2012 in sports in New York City
2014 disestablishments in New York (state)
2014 in sports in New York City
2010s in Brooklyn
College men's basketball competitions in the United States
College sports in New York City
Defunct sports competitions in the United States
Prospect Heights, Brooklyn
Recurring sporting events established in 2012
Recurring sporting events disestablished in 2014
Basketball competitions in New York City
Sports in Brooklyn

es:Coaches Vs. Cancer Classic